Cosimo Bolognino (born 30 January 1959 in Siderno, Italy) is a former Italian professional football referee. He was a full international for FIFA from 1999 until 2004.

References 

1959 births
Living people
Italian football referees
People from Siderno
Sportspeople from the Metropolitan City of Reggio Calabria